Mwesen (formerly known by its Mota name Mosina) is an Oceanic language spoken in the southeastern area of Vanua Lava Island, in the Banks Islands of northern Vanuatu, by about 10 speakers.

Mwesen shows many similarities with the island's dominant language Vurës, to such an extent that they have sometimes been considered dialects of a single language. However, studies have shown that Mwesen and Vurës have various dissimilarities, e.g. in their vowel systems, in their noun articles, in their pronoun paradigms.

Name
The name Mwesen is originally the name of a village, in the eastern part of Vanua Lava; it is spelled M̄ēsēn  both in Mwesen itself, and in neighbouring Vurës. The village is known as Am̄sēn  (with locative prefix a-) in Mwotlap, and as M̄osina  (modern: M̄osna ) in Mota. All these different names are derived from a Proto-Torres-Banks form *mʷosina.

The old Mota name M̄osina was the source of Mosina, one of the names which was occasionally given, in English, to the Mwesen language (sometimes encompassing Mwesen together with Vurës).

Phonology
Mwesen has 7 phonemic vowels. These are all short monophthongs :

Grammar
The system of personal pronouns in Mwesen contrasts clusivity, and distinguishes four numbers (singular, dual, trial, plural).

Spatial reference in Mwesen is based on a system of geocentric (absolute) directionals, which is in part typical of Oceanic languages, in part innovative.

References

Bibliography

 .

External links
 Audio recordings in the Mwesen language, in open access, by A. François (source: Pangloss Collection of CNRS)
 Kpwet, the Trickster God: A story in Mwesen, presented in trilingual format (by A. François)

Banks–Torres languages
Languages of Vanuatu
Critically endangered languages